is a Japanese Olympic and Asian record-holding swimmer. She swam in the 2004 and 2008 Olympic Games, winning the bronze medals in the 200m backstroke at both editions.  In doing so, she became the first Japanese woman in 72 years to win medals at consecutive Olympic games. She retired shortly after achieving this, in October 2008.

At the 2008 Olympics, Nakamura set the Asian Records and Japanese Records in both the 100 and 200 backstrokes (59.36 and 2:07.13).

At the 2007 World Championships, she swam to a new Japanese Record in the 100 back (1:00.40) in finishing third. Eight days later, she lowered the mark to 1:00.29 in winning the 2007 Japan Championships.

See also
 World record progression 100 metres backstroke
 World record progression 200 metres backstroke

References

1982 births
Japanese female backstroke swimmers
Olympic swimmers of Japan
Swimmers at the 2004 Summer Olympics
Swimmers at the 2008 Summer Olympics
Olympic bronze medalists for Japan
Living people
Sportspeople from Yokohama
Nippon Sport Science University alumni
World record setters in swimming
Olympic bronze medalists in swimming
World Aquatics Championships medalists in swimming
Medalists at the FINA World Swimming Championships (25 m)
Asian Games medalists in swimming
Swimmers at the 2002 Asian Games
Swimmers at the 2006 Asian Games
Medalists at the 2008 Summer Olympics
Medalists at the 2004 Summer Olympics
Universiade medalists in swimming
Asian Games gold medalists for Japan
Asian Games silver medalists for Japan
Asian Games bronze medalists for Japan
Medalists at the 2002 Asian Games
Medalists at the 2006 Asian Games
Universiade gold medalists for Japan
Universiade silver medalists for Japan
Universiade bronze medalists for Japan
Medalists at the 2001 Summer Universiade
Medalists at the 2003 Summer Universiade
21st-century Japanese women